Atkinson-Smith House is a historic plantation home located near Smithfield, Johnston County, North Carolina.

Description and history 
It was built about 1850, and is a two-story, three bay, Greek Revival style frame dwelling. It has a low hipped roof and exterior end chimneys. The front facade features a two-tier superimposed tetrastyle entrance portico with fluted Doric order columns.  It was the home of Congressman William A. Smith (1828-1888).

It was listed on the National Register of Historic Places on June 5, 1975.

References

Greek Revival houses in North Carolina
Houses completed in 1850
Buildings and structures in Smithfield, North Carolina
Houses in Johnston County, North Carolina
Houses on the National Register of Historic Places in North Carolina
National Register of Historic Places in Johnston County, North Carolina